Jao or JAO may refer to:
 Jewish Autonomous Oblast, a federal subject of Russia
 Yanyuwa language (ISO 639-3: jao), an Australian Aboriginal language

People 
 Jao Mapa (born 1976), Philippine actor and painter

Surname 
 Rao (Chinese surname), romanized as Jao in Wade–Giles
 Frank Jao, Vietnamese American businessman
 Radmar Agana Jao, American priest and former actor

See also 
Chao (disambiguation), for other East Asian uses sometimes transliterated "jao"